Francis Hamilton (Frank) Fasson was a Scotland international rugby union player. He played at Half Back.

Life

He was the son of Charles Hamilton Fasson MD, Superintendent of Edinburgh Royal Infirmary, by his second wife, Margaret Sarah Robertson, who died when Frank was five.

He trained as a lawyer and in 1910 is listed as Francis H. Fasson WS living at 10 Murrayfield Drive in West Edinburgh.

In the First World War he served as a Captain in the Scottish Horse regiment.

He died in Jedburgh on 23 October 1955.

Rugby Union career

Amateur career

He played for Cambridge University.

He then played for London Scottish and Edinburgh Wanderers.

Provincial career

Fasson played for the Anglo-Scots in 1898.

International career

He was capped 5 times for Scotland from 1900 to 1902.

Family

He married Lilias Clara Bruce and was father to Tony Fasson a hero of the Second World War.

References

1877 births
1955 deaths
Scottish rugby union players
Scotland international rugby union players
Cambridge University R.U.F.C. players
Rugby union players from Peebles
Scottish Exiles (rugby union) players
London Scottish F.C. players
Edinburgh Wanderers RFC players